Slettheitoppen or Øvre Slettheia is a neighbourhood in the city of Kristiansand in Agder county, Norway. It is located in the borough of Vågsbygd and in the district of Slettheia.  The neighborhood lies west of Trane and northwest of Nedre Slettheia.  The Øvre Slettheia skole is an elementary school in the neighbourhood.

Transportation 
Bus line M3 stops at Øvre Slettheia and continues to Vågsbygd Church, Søm, or Kvadraturen.

References

Geography of Kristiansand
Neighbourhoods of Kristiansand